The Angamos was built in England for the "Fratelli Lavarello Fu G. B.", from Génova, under the name Citta de Venezia. Later she was sold to William Ruys & Zonen, from Rotterdam and renamed Spartan

In 1891, during the Chilean Civil War of 1891, she was sold to the Chilean government, renamed Angamos, but she arrived to Valparaíso in 1892, after the end of the war and was operated by the CSAV.

On 6 July 1928 she sailed bound for Talcahuano under Captain Ismael Suárez Maldonado as she sunk off Punta Morguillas , Lebu, Chile. 262 persons died, only 7 Persons could be rescued. It was the second biggest single-incident maritime losses of life in the history of Chile.

See also
Chilean ship Cazador, the biggest single-incident maritime losses of life in the history of Chile

References

External links
Chilean Navy website Angamos, transporte (2do)., retrieved on 15 August 2013
Cueca de Hundimiento del Angamos
Histamar Angamos
Blog Hundimiento del Angamos : several reports about the sinking of the Angamos, in Spanish Language

Shipwrecks in the Chilean Sea
Maritime incidents in 1928
Maritime incidents in Chile
Auxiliary ships of Chile
1890 ships